José Rizo Castellón (27 September 1944 – 23 April 2019) was a Nicaraguan politician, affiliated with the Constitutional Liberal Party (PLC). Rizo was a lawyer trained at the Universidad Centroamericana of Managua in Nicaragua; he also studied in the London School of Economics.

Biography 
Rizo was nominated as the PLC's presidential candidate for the 2006 election in which he finished in third place behind Daniel Ortega and Eduardo Montealegre, receiving 25.11% of the vote. Rizo previously served as vice president under Enrique Bolaños, from 2002 until he resigned in 2005 to pursue the presidency. José Antonio Alvarado was his vice-presidential running mate. He died of a terminal illness on 23 April 2019 in Santiago, Chile, at the age of 74.

References

1944 births
2019 deaths
People from Jinotega Department
Vice presidents of Nicaragua
Central American University (Managua) alumni